Lukmanier Pass (Italian: Passo del Lucomagno, Romansh: Cuolm Lucmagn) is a pass at an elevation of 1915 m in the Swiss Alps.

The road from Disentis/Mustér in the canton of Graubünden leads through the Val Medel across the pass to the Blenio valley and Biasca in the canton of Ticino. North of the pass, the road runs along the east shore of Lake Sontga Maria. The highest elevation reached by the road is 1973 m, in the 2-km-long Lukmanier tunnel running along the lake. However, the pass is marked at the southern exit from the tunnel, on the site of the Lukmanier Hospice, at an elevation of 1915 m.

The Pass is kept open during the winter but even then it often closes after 18:00 hours (6:00 pm).

Below the Lukmanier Pass, or more precisely between it and Pizzo dell'Uomo, runs the Gotthard Base Tunnel.

See also
 List of highest paved roads in Switzerland
 List of highest road passes in Switzerland
 List of mountain passes in Switzerland

References

External links

Mountain passes of Ticino
Mountain passes of the Alps
Mountain passes of Graubünden
Graubünden–Ticino border
Lepontine Alps
Disentis
Medel (Lucmagn)